The Australian cricket team toured India in the 1984–85 season to play a five-match one day international series against India. The series was to help celebrate the Golden Jubilee of the Ranji Trophy.

Australia won the series 3-0 with two matches abandoned for rain. It was Australia's first ever victory in a one-day series on the subcontinent, and especially notable considering India had just won the 1983 Cricket World Cup. It was the only time Kim Hughes captained Australia to a series victory overseas.

Australian squad
Australia had just lost a test series against the West Indies 3-0. The tour was relatively last minute with the Indian Cricket Board not requesting a team until June 1984.

The original squad was selected by a brand-new selection panel, Lawrie Sawle, Greg Chappell and Rick McCosker. It was as follows:
Batsmen – Kim Hughes (captain), Allan Border (vice captain), Kepler Wessels, Graeme Wood, Steve Smith, Graham Yallop, Greg Ritchie
Fastbowlers – Geoff Lawson, Carl Rackemann, John Maguire, Rodney Hogg
Spinners – Tom Hogan, Murray Bennett 
Wicketkeepers – Wayne B. Phillips
Manager – Bob Merriman
Australia's selectors would be Hughes, Border and Rodney Hogg.

Surprise omissions from the tour were David Hookes and Greg Matthews. They were also excluded from a 16-person list of cricketers to be offered playing contracts by the ACB.

ODI series
Sunil Gavaskar was reinstated as captain of India following a series of defeats under Kapil Dev.

1st ODI

2nd ODI

3rd ODI

4th ODI

5th ODI

Tour Game

Tour Match: Mumbai vs. Australia

Mike Coward, who covered the tour, wrote that the series victory "was a triumph for [Kim] Hughes who meticulously planned each of the matches and ensured that this young team played the limited-over game at a more sophisticated level." Rodney Hogg returned early due to bronchitis.

South African Rebel Tours
On the way back from the tour, several Australian players met up with representatives of the South African Cricket Board in Singapore. This led to the South African rebel tours.

References

External links
Australian cricket team in India in 1984-85 at Cricinfo
Australian cricket team in India in 1984-85 at CricketArchive

1984 in Australian cricket
1984 in Indian cricket
1984-85
Indian cricket seasons from 1970–71 to 1999–2000
International cricket competitions from 1980–81 to 1985